Brett Alan Hundley Jr. (born June 15, 1993) is an American football quarterback for the Vegas Vipers of the XFL. He played college football for the UCLA Bruins, where he was the school's career leader in both total offense and touchdown passes. He was drafted by the Green Bay Packers in the fifth round of the 2015 NFL Draft, and started nine games for them in 2017 following a collarbone injury to Aaron Rodgers.

Early years and high school career
Hundley attended Chandler High School in Chandler, Arizona, where he played high school football for the Wolves football team. As a junior, he completed 107 of 170 passes for 1,517 yards with 16 touchdown passes and two interceptions. As a senior, he completed 139 of 225 passes for 2,348 yards with 20 touchdowns and two interceptions. Hundley's overall record as a starter in high school was 16–8. He was ranked as the second best dual-threat quarterback recruit in his class by Rivals.com.

College career

Redshirt freshman season
After redshirting in 2011, Hundley was named the UCLA starting quarterback for the 2012 season. In his first college game, against Rice, Hundley's first play was a 72-yard run for a touchdown that led to a 49–24 victory. In his second start against the No. 16 Nebraska Cornhuskers, Hundley had 305 passing yards and four touchdown passes as UCLA upset the Cornhuskers 36–30 in their home opener. Hundley also helped UCLA defeat the USC Trojans 38–28 for the first time since 2006, passing for 234 yards including 1 touchdown. In addition, Hundley ran for 2 touchdowns. The Bruins advanced to the Pac-12 Football Championship Game against Stanford, but were defeated 27–24. UCLA finished the season with a record of 9–5, and were ranked No. 17 by the Associated Press. Hundley set a school single season record with 3,740 yards passing.

Sophomore season

In 2013, Hundley led the Bruins to a 10-win season. The team beat USC, by a score of 35–14, marking consecutive wins over their crosstown rivals for the first time in over a decade. UCLA won the Sun Bowl, 42–12, over Virginia Tech with Hundley being named the game's co-most valuable player with teammate Jordan Zumwalt. Hundley ran for 161 yards and two touchdowns on just 10 carries while also throwing for 226 yards and another two scores. For the year, his 748 yards rushing were the school's third-most rushing yards in a season by a quarterback. Two NFL teams told Adam Schefter of ESPN that Hundley was potentially the top quarterback of the 2014 NFL Draft if he left school early. However, Hundley elected to return for his junior year at UCLA. Leading up to the draft, some scouts questioned Hundley's passing accuracy and decision making.

Junior season
Wary of the criticism of his passing skills, Hundley attempted to impress the pro scouts by running the ball less to begin the 2014 season. The team began the season undefeated at 4–0 until the No. 8 Bruins were upset 30–28 by the Utah Utes. In the game, Hundley was sacked a career-high 10 times, renewing concerns over his pocket awareness. Through 32 career games, he was sacked 107 times, the highest among active Football Bowl Subdivision quarterbacks. Hundley eventually ran more, including 24 carries for a season-high 131 yards in a 17–7 win over Arizona. Later in the season, he also became UCLA's all-time leader in touchdown passes, surpassing Cade McNown's record of 68; McNown's record came in four years as a starter (1995–1998), while Hundley broke the record in just his third season. Hundley also became the school's career leader in total offense, breaking McNown's previous mark of 11,285. He was named to the All-Pac-12 second team. He finished his career with 9,966 passing yards, second in school history behind McNown. He had also rushed for 1,747 career yards, behind only John Sciarra (1,813) among quarterbacks in UCLA history.

After the season, Hundley entered the 2015 NFL Draft and was chosen much later than expected, in the fifth round with the 147th overall pick by the Green Bay Packers.

College statistics

Professional career

Green Bay Packers

Hundley was drafted by the Green Bay Packers in the fifth round of the 2015 NFL Draft with the 147th overall pick. On May 7, 2015, the Packers officially signed Hundley to a four-year deal. He became the third-string quarterback on the depth chart behind Aaron Rodgers and Scott Tolzien. Hundley's success in the preseason and off-the-field maturity eventually led to his being named as the Packers' backup quarterback after Tolzien's departure to the Indianapolis Colts.

During the first quarter of the Week 6 game against the Minnesota Vikings on October 15, 2017, Rodgers suffered a broken collarbone on a hit by Anthony Barr. Hundley then entered the game, completing 18-of-33 passes for 157 yards, one touchdown, and three interceptions as the Packers lost by a score of 23–10. After the game, head coach Mike McCarthy stated that Hundley would take over as the starter due to Rodgers's broken collarbone. In his first start against the New Orleans Saints, Hundley recorded 12 completions on 25 attempts for just 87 yards, no touchdowns, an interception, and a passer rating under 40 for the second consecutive week, though he did contribute a 14-yard rushing touchdown. After a Week 8 bye, Hundley had 245 passing yards and a rushing touchdown in a loss to the Detroit Lions in Week 9. Week 10 continued this improvement, with 18 of 25 passing for 212 yards, no interceptions, and his first 100+ passer rating as a starter in a win over the Chicago Bears. Hundley had 200+ passing yards for his third consecutive outing in Week 11, but had three interceptions and no touchdowns during the team's shutout loss to the Baltimore Ravens. In a Week 12 loss to the Pittsburgh Steelers, Hundley improved with a 134 passer rating and three touchdowns. During Week 13 against the Tampa Bay Buccaneers, Hundley was held to only 84 passing yards and an interception. He rushed for 66 yards with the Packers combining for 199 rushing yards and winning 26–20 in overtime. He followed that up with 265 passing yards and three touchdowns against the Cleveland Browns in a 27–21 overtime win. After the Packers were eliminated from postseason contention, Hundley struggled going 17-of-40 for 130 passing yards and two interceptions in the 16–0 loss to the Vikings. In the season finale against the Lions, he had 172 passing yards, one touchdown, and two interceptions in the 35–11 loss. He also had his first career reception on a 10-yard pass from wide receiver Randall Cobb on a trick play. Overall, in the 2017 season, Hundley finished with 1,836 passing yards, nine touchdowns, 12 interceptions, 270 rushing yards, and two rushing touchdowns.

Seattle Seahawks
On August 29, 2018, Hundley was traded to the Seattle Seahawks for a sixth round pick in the 2019 NFL Draft, which was used on running back Dexter Williams.

Arizona Cardinals
On March 14, 2019, Hundley signed a one-year contract with the Arizona Cardinals, worth $1.88 million. He served as backup quarterback to rookie Kyler Murray, whom the Cardinals drafted first overall in the 2019 NFL Draft. On December 22, 2019, Hundley came in to relieve of Murray after he suffered a hamstring injury. Hundley finished the game with 4-of-9 passes for 49 yards and scrambled for 35 yards as the Cardinals would go on to win the Week 16 matchup against the Seattle Seahawks 27–13.

On March 27, 2020, Hundley re-signed with the Cardinals on a one-year deal.

Indianapolis Colts
On July 31, 2021, Hundley signed with the Indianapolis Colts. He was released on August 31, 2021, and re-signed to the practice squad the next day. On September 25, 2021, Hundley was elevated to the active roster and was returned to the practice squad two days later. On October 2, 2021, Hundley was once again elevated to the active roster and was returned to the practice squad two days later. On October 10, 2021, Hundley was signed to the active roster. He was released on November 1, 2021, and re-signed to the practice squad. His contract expired when the teams season ended on January 9, 2022.

Baltimore Ravens
On May 26, 2022, Hundley signed with the Baltimore Ravens. He was released on August 16, 2022.

New Orleans Saints
On November 2, 2022, the New Orleans Saints signed Hundley to their practice squad. He was released on November 8, 2022.

Baltimore Ravens (second stint)
On December 5, 2022, Hundley signed with the Baltimore Ravens' practice squad. Hundley was elevated to the active roster on January 7, 2023, for the game against the Cincinnati Bengals. His practice squad contract with the team expired after the season on January 15, 2023.

Vegas Vipers 
Hundley signed with the Vegas Vipers of the XFL on January 30, 2023.

NFL career statistics

Regular season

Postseason

Spring League statistics

Personal life
Hundley is an Evangelical Christian. Hundley's father, Brett Sr., was a running back at the University of Arizona, and his uncle played quarterback at Wichita State University. He is also a member of Kappa Alpha Psi. His sister, Paris, deals with epilepsy. Since 2011, Hundley has been involved with many charitable epilepsy organizations and fundraisers.

References

External links

UCLA Bruins bio

1993 births
Living people
21st-century African-American sportspeople
Players of American football from Arizona
African-American players of American football
Sportspeople from Chandler, Arizona
American football quarterbacks
UCLA Bruins football players
Green Bay Packers players
Seattle Seahawks players
Arizona Cardinals players
Indianapolis Colts players
Baltimore Ravens players
New Orleans Saints players